Soyuz 38 was a human spaceflight mission conducted by the Soviet Union during September, 1980. The Soyuz spacecraft brought two visiting crew members to the Salyut 6 space station, one of whom was an Intercosmos cosmonaut from Cuba.

Crew

Backup crew

Mission parameters
Mass: 6800 kg
Perigee: 199.7 km
Apogee: 273.5 km
Inclination: 51.63°
Period: 88.194 minutes

Mission highlights
12th expedition to Salyut 6. 7th international crew. Carried Intercosmos cosmonaut from Cuba. The Soyuz 38 docking occurred in darkness. As the spacecraft approached Salyut 6, the crew on the space station could see only its “headlights.”
Ryumin filmed ignition and operation of the transport's main engine.
Arnaldo Tamayo Méndez of Cuba and Soviet cosmonaut Yuri Romanenko docked without incident.

The purpose of the Soyuz 38 mission was to carry out nine experiments. They stimulated different areas of the brain to further understand the electrical activity in our brain. This was done using a customized helmet for each cosmonaut with silver electrodes and a tape recorder. The cosmonauts also wore special shoes to study the structure and motion of feet changes during weightlessness. They also collaborated with the Cuban Institute of Endocrinology and Metabolic Diseases to examine blood and urine samples throughout the entire launch, stay, and return to explore the psychological stress from preparation and working long hours under constant weightlessness. Another experiment they conducted was centered around studying changes in the levels of skeletal muscle structure. They used a Cuban made instrument to assess the adipose tissue and the stimulation of body fat. There was also a study on blood circulation, which sought to determine the impact weightlessness has on the human circulatory system. Tests had been carried out in previous flights and were repeated during this mission using a Chibis suit, a below-the-waist reduced-pressure device. Crew members completed exercise protocols wearing the Chibis to provide gravity-simulating stress to the body's cardiovascular/circulatory system and re-establishing the body's orthostatic tolerance after extended periods of microgravity. Negative pressure on the legs causes blood to accumulate in the lower extremities, which is the case in a gravity environment. Orthostatic intolerance has been a frequent complaint in humans returning from long-duration space flights.  The other experiments attempted to study how cell division, the immune system, concentrations of antibodies and other proteins and minerals were affected after prolonged exposure to a weightless environment. This included measurements into the amount and rate at which humans lost water, fat, and other minerals.The cosmonauts also studied the growth of a single crystal of sucrose in the same environment.

See also

List of human spaceflights to Salyut space stations
List of Salyut expeditions

References

External links
 Soyuz 38 – NSSDC Id: 1980-075A

Crewed Soyuz missions
Spacecraft launched in 1980
Spacecraft which reentered in 1980
Spacecraft launched by Soyuz-U rockets
1980 in Cuba
1980 in the Soviet Union
Cuba–Soviet Union relations